Axiom Mission 3 (or Ax-3) is a planned private spaceflight to the International Space Station. The flight, scheduled to launch no earlier than November 2023, will be operated by Axiom Space and use Crew Dragon spacecraft.

Mission
The flight will lift off from Launch Complex 39A at Kennedy Space Center in Florida. From there, it will fly to the International Space Station. Once the mission is complete, it will splash down in the ocean.

Crew 
The flight is expected to include the first astronaut from Turkey, from the Turkish Space Agency.

References 

Axiom Space
2023 in spaceflight
2023 in the United States
Future human spaceflights
International Space Station